GBLA-18 (Darel-I) is a constituency of Gilgit Baltistan Assembly of the Darel District which is currently represented by Gulbar Khan of Pakistan Tehreek-e-Insaf.

History 
Before 2019, the constituency was of Diamer District and was known as GBA-18 (Diamer-IV). In 2019, when Darel was made a district. The constituency is known as Darel-I.

Members

Election results

2009
Gulbar Khan of JUI-F became member of assembly in 2009 elections.

2015
Muhammad Wakeel of Pakistan Muslim League (N) won this seat by getting 3,622 votes.

2016
In May 2016 Muhammad Wakeel died of cardiac arrest. Imran Wakeel was elected on 12 July 2016 By-polls by securing 3917 votes.

References

Gilgit-Baltistan Legislative Assembly constituencies